Tom Terrific is a 1957–1959 animated series on American television, presented as part of the Captain Kangaroo children's television show.

Created by Gene Deitch under the Terrytoons studio (which by that time was a subsidiary of CBS, the network that broadcast Captain Kangaroo), Tom Terrific was made as twenty-six stories, each split into five episodes, with one five-minute episode broadcast per day. The first thirteen stories were filmed in 1957, with the second set in 1958. Captain Kangaroo continued to rerun the episodes for many years. Starting in 1962, Captain Kangaroo broadcast Tom Terrific every other week, alternating with Terrytoons' Lariat Sam.

Drawn in a simple black-and white style reminiscent of children's drawings, the show features a gee-whiz boy hero, Tom Terrific, who lives in a treehouse and can transform himself into anything he wants, thanks to his magical funnel-shaped "thinking cap", which also enhances his intelligence. He has a comic lazybones of a sidekick, Mighty Manfred the Wonder Dog, and an arch-foe named Crabby Appleton, whose motto is, "I'm rotten to the core!" Other foes include Mr. Instant the Instant Thing King, Captain Kidney Bean, Sweet Tooth Sam the Candy Bandit, and Isotope Feeney the Meany. Some of the dialogue was written by cartoonist Jules Feiffer.

Gene Deitch adapted the feature from his earlier newspaper comic strip, "Terr'ble Thompson!" distributed during the 1950s by United Features Syndicate.  Terr'ble Thompson was a six-year-old boy who imagined himself to be the "Hero of Hist'ry" and freely travelled back in time to assist historical figures. An illustrated book reprinting the adventures of this precursor to Tom Terrific was published by Fantagraphics Books.

All the voices were performed by Lionel Wilson (who later voiced Eustace Bagge from the Cartoon Network series Courage the Cowardly Dog).

The character Tom Terrific was ranked #32 by TV Guide magazine on its 2002 list of "50 Greatest TV Cartoon Characters".

Episodes
Each episode was shown in five installments, one per day, Monday through Friday.

Home video
, there has not been an authorized VHS, DVD or Blu-ray release of the series.

In popular culture
 The character also appeared in a comic book for six issues in 1957 from Pines Comics, with some stories drawn by Ralph Bakshi.
 Tom Terrific appeared in a few Wonder Books, an imitation of Little Golden Books.
 Crabby Appleton was the name of a rock group, which used the character's image on a 1971 album, Rotten to the Core.
 In the introduction to his book, The Great Big Book of Tomorrow, Tom Tomorrow (Dan Perkins) says that he chose his pseudonym through misremembering the name of Tom Terrific.
 Tom Terrific appeared in the 1999 pilot Curbside, voiced by Haley Joel Osment.
 American football player Tom Brady attempted to trademark the phrase for himself, but was turned down in August 2019, to prevent confusion with baseball player Tom Seaver.

References

Further reading
Kevin Scott Collier. The Amazing Transformations of Tom Terrific. CreateSpace Independent Publishing Platform, 2017.

External links

Theme song

1957 American television series debuts
1959 American television series endings
1950s American animated television series
American children's animated comedy television series
Animated television series about children
Animated television series about dogs
Television series about shapeshifting
Television series by Terrytoons